The Ghana women's national basketball team represents Ghana in international basketball competitions. It is administered by the Amateur Basketball Association of Ghana (GBBA).

The team has consistently lacked government support and has often only been able to compete because of the help of individuals.

3x3 team
Placed 7th in FIBA 3x3 Africa cup

See also
Ghana women's national under-19 basketball team

References

Ghana
Basketball
Basketball
1962 establishments in Ghana
Women's sport in Ghana